The Bengal Legislative Council ( was the legislative council of Bengal Presidency (now Bangladesh and the Indian state of West Bengal).
It was the legislature of the Bengal Presidency during the late 19th and early 20th centuries. After reforms were adopted in 1937, it served as the upper house of the Bengali legislature until the partition of India.

History

The council was established under the Indian Councils Act 1861. It was dominated by Europeans and Anglo-Indians, with natives as a minority, until reforms in 1909. Under the Indian Councils Act 1892 and Indian Councils Act 1909, representatives of municipalities, district boards, city corporations, universities, ports, plantations, zamindars, Muslim electorates and chambers of commerce were inducted. Native Bengali representation gradually increased. Its voting power was limited, particularly on budgets. It was delegated "transferred subjects" of education, public health, local government, agriculture and public works; while the "reserved subjects" of finance, police, land revenue, law, justice and labour remained with the Executive Council headed by the Governor of Bengal. Between 1905 and 1912, the council's geographical coverage was divided and partly delegated to the Eastern Bengal and Assam Legislative Council. During the period of dyarchy, the council was boycotted by the Congress Party and Swaraj Party; but constitutionalists in the Bengal Provincial Muslim League continued to be active members.

Under the Government of India Act 1935, the council became the upper chamber of the legislature of Bengal.

Membership

The council grew from 12 members in 1862, to 20 in 1892, 53 in 1909, 140 in 1919 and 63–65 in 1935.

Act of 1861
Under the Act of 1861, the council included 12 members nominated by the Lieutenant Governor of Bengal. The members included four government officials, four non-government Anglo-Indians and four Bengali gentlemen. From 1862 to 1893, 123 persons were nominated to the council, of whom only 49 were native Indian members, 35 were members of the British Indian Association and 26 were aristocrats.

Act of 1892
Under the Act of 1892, the Lieutenant Governor could nominate 7 members on the recommendation of the Bengal Chamber of Commerce, municipalities, district councils, the University of Calcutta and the Corporation of Calcutta.

Act of 1909
Under the Act of 1909, the council had the following composition.
Ex-officio members 
Lieutenant Governor
Executive Councillors- 2 
Nominated members
Officials- 17 maximum
Indian commerce- 1
Planters- 1
Experts- 2
Others- 3 minimum
Elected members
Corporation of Calcutta- 1
University of Calcutta- 1
Municipalities- 6
District boards- 6
Landholders- 5
Muhammadans- 4
Bengal Chamber of Commerce- 2
Calcutta Traders Association- 1

Act of 1919

Under the Act of 1919, the council had 140 members. They included 92 seats assigned to general constituencies and 22 seats assigned to separate electorates, including Muslims, Christians and Anglo-Indians. The Port of Chittagong, the Port of Calcutta, the jute industry, the tea
industry were also represented.

Act of 1935
As the upper chamber under the Government of India Act 1935, the council had the following composition.
 General elected seats - 10
 Muslim electorate seats - 17
 European electorate seats - 3
 Nominees of the Bengal Legislative Assembly- 27 
 Nominees of the Governor of Bengal- 'not less than 6 and not more than 8'.

Tenure
The legislative council was initially given a three-year tenure. It became a permanent body under the Government of India Act 1935, which required one third of its members to retire.

Head of the council
The Lieutenant Governor was the ex-officio president of the council until 1909, when the council was given the right to elect its president and deputy president.

References

External links
 

1862 establishments in British India
1947 disestablishments in British India
Bengal Presidency
Historical legislatures in Bangladesh
Defunct upper houses in India